The American Embassy is an American drama series that aired on Fox from March to April 2002. The series was created by James D. Parriott, and executive produced by Danny DeVito.

Synopsis
The series follows the personal and professional life of Emma Brody (played by Arija Bareikis), a young woman from the United States who entered the U.S. Foreign Service to get away from her dysfunctional life in Toledo, Ohio. Assigned to the U.S. Embassy in London as a vice consul, she is faced with new dilemmas that arise out of the challenging work of a Foreign Service Officer, as well as the personal issues that caused her to seek out the job in the first place.

The show was broadcast in 2002 and touched on many sensitive issues regarding terrorism and post-9/11 American foreign policy. One episode was dedicated to the effects of racial profiling in which British and American personnel investigate a London mosque. Another episode touched on the effects of terrorist attacks after the embassy is hit by a car bomb. Lighter story lines focused on Brody's relationship with her London roommate, her younger sister in America, CIA agent Doug Roach, and Brody's budding romance with a British Lord.

Cast
Arija Bareikis as Emma Brody
David Cubitt as Doug Roach
Jonathan Cake as Jack Wellington
Helen Carey as Janet Westerman
Jonathan Adams as Elque Polk
Michael Cerveris as Gary Forbush 
Davenia McFadden as Carmen Jones 
Reiko Aylesworth as Liz Shoop
Nicholas Irons as James Wellington

Episodes

Cancellation
The show was canceled by Fox after only 4 episodes being broadcast. A total of six episodes were produced, and all six episodes were aired by the Seven Network in Australia. Although both set and filmed in Britain, the series has never aired in the United Kingdom.

References

External links
 
 

2002 American television series debuts
2002 American television series endings
2000s American drama television series
English-language television shows
Television shows set in London
Fox Broadcasting Company original programming
Television series by 20th Century Fox Television